Myristica argentea is a tree that grows in the primary rain forests of New Guinea. It is occasionally a source of nutmeg, and it (or its seed) is called Macassar nutmeg, Papua(n) nutmeg, long nutmeg or silver nutmeg. M. malabarica is used to adulterate true nutmeg, which comes from Myristica fragrans.

Description
The leaves are simple and spiral. The petiole is stout, cracked transversally, channeled, and 2.8 cm
long. The blade is glossy, 20 cm
× 6.4 cm – 13.5 cm
× 5.6 cm – 19 cm
× 6 cm, elliptic, acuminate at
the apex in a tail, and shows 13–18 pairs of secondary nerves. The inflorescences are 4.5 cm-long
racemes. The fruits are globose and 6mm long.

References

argentea